Bratoszewice  is a village in the administrative district of Gmina Stryków, within Zgierz County, Łódź Voivodeship, in central Poland.

The village has a population of 1,100.

Level crossing crash 
On 30 July 2012 at about 6:00am (0400 GMT)  nine people were killed and one seriously injured after a train and a minibus collided at an unguarded railway level crossing in Bratoszewice. There were ten people in the minibus, mostly seasonal workers from the Ukraine. Passengers on the train were uninjured.

References

Bratoszewice